True Dare Kiss is a six-part British television drama series, created by screenwriter Debbie Horsfield, that first broadcast on BBC One on 28 June 2007. The series follows the reunion of four sisters and a brother following the death of their estranged father, as they embark on a long journey to uncover the truth, revealing secrets surrounding a cataclysmic event in the past. The series, produced by Marcus Wilson, is set in the city of Manchester in the North-West of England. Filming began on the series on 8 January 2007. The series featured a high-profile cast including Pooky Quesnel, Lorraine Ashbourne, Paul McGann, Dervla Kirwan, David Bradley and Paul Hilton. The complete series was released on DVD on 3 September 2007. Horsfield was interviewed about how the Manchester-based story came to life in the Manchester Evening News.

Cast

Main cast
 Pooky Quesnel as Nita McKinnon
 Lorraine Ashbourne as Beth Sweeney
 Paul Hilton as Dennis Tyler
 Paul McGann as Nash McKinnon
 Dervla Kirwan as Phillipa Tyler
 Esther Hall as Alice Tyler
 Brendan Coyle as Kaz Sweeney
 Ciarán McMenamin as Bryce Waghorn
 David Bradley as Stanley Tyler

Supporting cast
 Elliott Tittensor as JJ
 Samantha Blakey as Lola
 Helen Moon as Nancy
 Nick Fletcher	as Dougie
 Nicky Bell as Ethan
 Carlton Dickinson as Georgie
 Anji Kreft as Lois
 Martin Wenner as Sven

Episodes

References

External links

True Dare Kiss at What's on TV

BBC high definition shows
BBC television dramas
British television miniseries
2007 British television series debuts
2007 British television series endings
2000s British drama television series
2000s British mystery television series
English-language television shows
Television shows set in Manchester